Coming Into Frame is the fifth studio album by the Albany-based pop rock band Sirsy, released on March 5, 2013. It is their first album with Funzalo Records. The album was produced by Paul Kolderie and Sean Slade.

Track listing

 Cannonball - 3:15
 Lionheart - 2:58
 Picture - 3:44
 Brave and Kind - 4:07
 Killer - 3:23
 Red Letter Days - 3:01
 Gold - 3:47
 Lot of Love - 3:17
 She's Coming Apart - 2:55
 The Cost of You - 4:19

Release History

The first track "Cannonball" was released on February 12, 2013 through iTunes, Spotify and other digital distribution methods. The album was released on March 5, 2013. An album release concert is scheduled for April 6, 2013, at Putnam Den in Saratoga Springs, New York.

References

Sirsy albums
2013 albums
Albums produced by Paul Q. Kolderie
Albums produced by Sean Slade